The Vandrevala Foundation is an NGO established by Cyrus Vandrevala and Priya Vandrevala in 2008. In 2009, it established the "Mental Health - India" initiative to raise awareness for and provide services to emotionally distressed individuals. Priya Vandrevala is the estranged daughter of Niranjan Hiranandani; father and daughter are fighting several cases in court against each other.

The organisation operates multiple crisis helplines in key Indian cities with the collaboration of Emmanuel Hospital Association, St Stephen's Hospital Delhi and the Mar Thoma Church. Its efforts have been noted by the media.

History

The Vandrevala Foundation's charitable activities include mental health care, has in the year 2014 had submitted a plan to the Maharashtra government to improve services in mental health institutions in the state. This is in response to a published report of World Health Organization(WHO) which placed India as being in top in the world for suicides. As per foundation's report India had 43 mental health hospitals and all being established before 1947 and many of them are in such a bad shape for people with mental illness to visit and seek guidance. World Health Organization(WHO) in its report estimated that out of 8,04,000 suicides in the world in the year 2012 around 2,58,000 are from India(99,997 women and 1,58,098 men) and the highest rate being seen among people aged between 15 years to 29 years. Report claims India's suicide rate was 21.1 per 1,00,000 people. The foundation has also entered into an agreement with the Director-General of Shipping in India to serve as the official mental health helpline for Indian sailors and their families around the globe. The "Mental Health-India" initiative was launched in 2009 by the Vandrevala Foundation established by London-based billionaire couple Priya Hiranandani-Vandrevala and Cyrus Vandrevala (who are originally from Mumbai). One of the objectives of the initiative is to prevent possible attempts of suicide by providing advice and assistance in English, Hindi, and all major Indian regional languages. Helpline had been created and started as a topmost priority as many individuals, most people know they need help but are not sure where it is available. In five years since its launch the foundation had handled 0.5 million cases.

A recent study by University of Oxford concluded that serious mental illnesses such as schizophrenia, bipolar disorder and recurrent depression reduces life expectancy by about seven to 20 years-a loss of years which is equivalent to or worse than that for heavy smokers. One of the doctors of Foundation, Dr.John, says the foundation addresses the entire spectrum of mental health issues from anxiety and depression through to schizophrenia and suicidal thoughts and suicide attempts. He also reiterated that although mental health problems and illnesses are disorders of the brain many people consider them as a 'character flaw' or a 'personal weakness' or even 'demonic possession', and as a result  majority of people with mental health problems won't seek help for fear of being labeled negatively."

Priya Hiranandani-Vandrevala further elaborated that when Cyrus and herself decided on making mental health a focal point for their Foundation, they were not aware of the gravity of the situation and how mental illness can have an effect on life expectancy of people. However, the study from the University of Oxford has highlighted this issue.

Operations
The Vandrevala Foundation operates its helpline on a virtual platform on a PAN INDIA level with counsellors based out of every state and capable of dealing with cases in regional language. This is made possible through their new cloud telephony based seamless service.

Through their website Vandrevala Foundation a person in distress can approach the counsellor through voice call, chat, WhatsApp, social media and email.

References

External links
 Official Website

Mental health organisations in India
Crisis hotlines
Non-profit organisations based in India
2008 establishments in India
Organizations established in 2008